A Simple Favor may refer to:

A Simple Favor (novel), a 2017 novel by Darcey Bell
A Simple Favor (film), a 2018 film based on the novel